Miglė Lendel, née Marozaitė (born 10 March 1996) is a Lithuanian professional track cyclist.

In 2016, she won bronze at 2016 UEC European Track Championships in team sprint together with Simona Krupeckaitė.

Major results

2014
2nd Team Sprint, Polish Cup (with Gintarė Gaivenytė)
2015
1st Team Sprint, Grand Prix of Poland (with Simona Krupeckaitė)
1st Sprint, International Belgian Open
2nd 500m Time Trial, Cottbuser SprintCup
2016
3rd  Team Sprint, UEC European Track Championships
3rd  Keirin, UEC European U23 Track Championships 

2017
Grand Prix of Tula
1st Sprint
2nd Keirin
2nd 500m Time Trial, Grand Prix of Moscow
3rd Sprint, Grand Prix Minsk
3rd Sprint, International track race - Panevežys

References

External links
 

Living people
Lithuanian female cyclists
Lithuanian track cyclists
Sportspeople from Panevėžys
1996 births
Cyclists at the 2019 European Games
European Games medalists in cycling
European Games silver medalists for Lithuania
Olympic cyclists of Lithuania
Cyclists at the 2020 Summer Olympics